Club Deportivo Atlético Baleares, S.A.D. is a Spanish football team based in Palma, Majorca, in the autonomous community of the Balearic Islands. Founded on 1920, it currently plays in Primera División RFEF – Group 2, hosting games at Estadio Balear with a capacity of 6,000 seats.

History 
The history of the entity was for many years without work and without any reference work. That is why, due to inertia and tradition, the origin of the club is still located in 1942, although in recent times the origin of 1920 was proven documentary, increasingly known and accepted.

The precedents (I): Mecánico (1920) 
On 3 April 1920 an article about the foundation of new soccer teams in Palma appeared in the Última Hora newspaper, until then created by fans of middle and upper social class. The following sentence stood out in the text:

For the first time, a workers extraction group formed a team, in charge of the company's workers Isleña Marítima, although naval machinists also participated in practices or students of this career. This team adopted the name of Mecánico.

Their shirts adopted the colors of the company: three vertical blue stripes on a white background, inspired by the initials I-M on the blue background of the chimneys in the vapors of the Isleña Marítima. The pants were blue to take advantage, properly trimmed, the work overalls of their workers. The social premises were in the café Can Rasca (67 Sant Miquel street, before 187), corner with Oms, of Palma. The team lacked field and played on an esplanade on the Muelle de Palma, approximately where the former offices of the Isleña Marítima were located.

The precedents (II): Fundición Carbonell (or Mallorca) (1920) 
In same newspaper, another phrase stood out:

A team founded by workers of the Fundición Carbonell, a small metalworking company in the city. The team initially bore the same name of the company and subsequently adopted the name Mallorca.

The team colors consisted of a totally white t-shirt and pants. They had their social place in café Can Meca (Arxiduc Lluís Salvador Street, corner with Avenues in Palma. They played their games in a field called sa Síquia Reial (the Royal Acequia), located between Avenues (Comte de Sallent avenue) and Blanquerna street of the city.

Birth of Baleares Football Club (1920) 
At one point the Mallorca (before Fundición Carbonell) left its social premises and went to the same one of the Mecánico. Due to the common labor extraction of the players and hobbies, there was soon attunement between them and they decided to join to form a more powerful club. Thus, on 14 November or 20 November (depending on sources) a founding assembly was held that approved the merger of Mecánico and Mallorca with the name Baleares Football Club. The name was unanimously accepted by the attendees, who considered it more regional and representative.

The social club of the new club remained in the café Can Rasca, which until then had been of both clubs. The pitch was the one that until then had used by Mallorca, sa Síquia Reial. As for the kit, the white and blue striped t-shirt of the Mecánico and the white pants of the Mallorca were adopted.

The new team debuted on 21 November 1920 winning 5–0 in Tirador velodrome to Veloz Sport Balear, at that time one of the most powerful teams.

The 20s and 30s. Growth and consolidation 
In 1921 Baleares FC played the first major tournament: the Copa Ayuntamiento of Palma and was second in a tournament that won the RS Alfonso XIII FC (current Real Mallorca). Since then the club was a regular at the local competitions.

Soon a fierce rivalry was developed that went beyond sports with the RS Alfonso XIII FC, a team followed and supported by the most well-off classes, as opposed to a Baleares FC whose origins came from the humblest estates. The new team achieved good results, although it almost touched him to play the role of eternal second by being overcome by his eternal rival or, later, by the CD Constancia of Inca. The rivalry Baleares FC versus RS Alfonso XIII Football Club remain until today with different names, until reaching the current Atlético Baleares and Real Mallorca.

Due to the growth of the club was built the new Son Canals Stadium in 1923.

Baleares FC participated in the Regional Balearic Championship, organized since 1923 by the Catalan Football Federation and since 1926 by the Balearic Islands Football Federation until the suppression in 1940. The club was always in the front line of the competition: it was runner-up nine times of the Majorca Championship, only surpassed by RS Alfonso XIII FC (after RCD Mallorca) or CD Constancia of Inca. It win the Mallorcan Championship in 1927–28 season, although it lose the Balearic Championship final to the UD Mahón by 1–0.

In other competitions he highlighted his triumph in the President of the Republic Cup, a tournament played by the first category teams of the Mallorcan championship during the 1933–34, 1934–35 and 1935–36 seasons, with a trophy in dispute awarded by the then president Niceto Alcalá Zamora. The Baleares FC was awarded the second and third edition and, consequently, the cup in dispute. The club was about to participate in the People's Olympiad in Barcelona to be held from 19 to 26 July on 1936; the military uprising caused the players to meet casually in the Republican zone at the start of the Spanish Civil War.

In 1940 the name Baleares Football Club was changed to Club de Fútbol Baleares, bound by the guidelines of the Franco regime that forced the Castilianization of all sports terminology.

Since 1940 played in Primera Regional de Mallorca when the Regional Balearic Championship became lower divisions of the Spanish Football League. Then the results resented and occupied low positions that threatened the descent to Segunda Regional de Mallorca; but not consummated.

Fusion with Athletic FC (1942) 
The Palma Council approved in 1942 an urban planning that forced another club, the CD Atlético (until 1941 Athletic FC), to leave his stadium Sa Punta. The club didn't have resources to get a new one and contacted other clubs to study a merger. First he tried CD Mallorca, but the negotiations broke down: the CD Atlético wanted the new club to be called Atlético-Mallorca, and the CD Mallorca did not want any change. Then the CD Atlético contacted the CF Baleares, the agreement was reached and signed on 27 May 1942, which consisted of the following points:

 Modify the name Club de Fútbol Baleares to Club Deportivo Atlético Baleares.
 Maintain the colors of the CF Baleares (blue and white) without variation of design.
 Continue the same headquarter and stadium of CF Baleares (Son Canals Stadium).
 Equality of the members according to origin of one or another club and parity in the board of directors.

The agreement was legally embodied as a merger, but in practice was a merger by absorption of CF Baleares over CD Atlético. CF Baleares social mass was more numerous and its humble essence was imposed on the middle class of the CD Atlético and the new club inherited the rivalry of CF Baleares with RCD Mallorca (CD Atlético maintained a more cordial relationship). The name CD Atlético was incorporated in the name of the entity, but the rest of its hallmarks (colors, stadium and shield) disappeared. Pere Serra Cladera, president of CF Baleares, was invested president and Francesc Riera Rigo, president of CD Atlético, vice president.

The 40s. Ascent to Tercera División 
The first season of Atlético Baleares  was 1942–43 and remained in Primera Regional. It only was surpassed by CD Mallorca, a success and both teams rose to the Tercera División. The new category assumed to play against teams from the peninsula and caused additional logistical, economic and displacement problems. During those years the results were medium, with the exception of the third place achieved in the 1945–46 and 1946–47 seasons and played the promotion to Segunda División in 1946 for the first time.

The 50s. Years of growth 
In 1950–51 season the team was champion of Tercera División. It played the promotion, was champion and ascended to Segunda División for first time in its history. and remained for two seasons until return to Tercera División in 1953. In Tercera División the team returned to the top positions: it was league champion in 1955–56 and played promotion in 1956, 1957 and 1958. But he failed to upgrade.

The club lived a success sports and social vitality and decided to build a new stadium: the old Son Canals Stadium had been small and the owners of the land threatened to evict. Since 1958 the project was approved, built and inaugurated on 8 May 1960 with a match against Birmingham City FC and winning the 2–0 stake.

The 60s. Years of splendor 
Few days after the inauguration of Estadio Balear the club played the promotion, but neither did it again. But the positive dynamics were unstoppable and in 1960–61 season they were champion of Tercera División and won the promotion to Segunda División.

The club remained in Segunda División the seasons 1961–62 and 1962–63, and in the latter descended to Tercera División. Despite the decline maintained considerable potential, since it always finished in the top positions and was classified for the promotion phase in 1964, 1965, 1966 and 1968; but he failed to ascend. In these years the championships of Tercera División of 1965 and 1968 stand out.

The 70s. Institutional and sportive crisis 
Since end of the 60s the club was worsening its economic situation and gradually worsened its results with increasingly dangerous classifications, until in 1972–73 season descended to Regional Preferente and remained two seasons. The Tercera División was recovered in 1974–75 season, but the results continued to be mediocre.

For the season 1977–78 was created the Segunda Division B and the team went up from Tercera Division. But that season finished the last and returned to Tercera División, in which again it obtained poor classifications.

To the crisis of the club we must add the disappearance of direct sports rivalry with Real Mallorca. From the 1979–80 season the derbies stopped, except the plays in Nicolau Brondo Trophy during 80s and 90s, or 1986–87 season of Copa del Rey.

The 80s. Bottoming and sports boom 

Again in Tercera División (now was, in fact, a fourth level) disappointing sporting results continued until a new descent to Regional Preferente in 1980–81 season. Socially and economically there was no peace in the club, and the team spent two seasons to climb.

After return to Tercera División in 1983–84 season the team returned to top positions and dispute the promotion to Segunda División B in 1986, despite not achieving it. But a restructuring of the Segunda División B, for extended it from two to four groups, helped the club and ascended in 1986–87 season. This was its second ascent to Segunda División B.

The team remained three seasons in Segunda Division B: 1987–88, 1988–89 and 1989–90. During the 1988–89 season the team was very close to leadership that then provided the direct ascent to Segunda División, but the next season descended again to Tercera División. Further, an endemic economic and institutional problems were added the bad state of the Estadio Balear and the poor assistance to the matches. Even when the team was near to direct ascent to Segunda División the ticket office was scarce.

The 90s. Deceptive stability 

After returning to Tercera División in 1990, the team entered into a bittersweet sports dynamic that lasted for more than a decade. First, the club always played a good role in the league: between 1990–91 and 2001–02 seasons the team qualified in the top four (except in 1992–93) to play the promotion to Segunda División B and in addition it was league champion four times, three in a row (1998, 2000, 2001 and 2002). At least sportingly, the club worked.

But the promotion to Segunda División B always ended disastrously. The club disputed it in 1991, 1992, 1994, 1995, 1996, 1997, 1998, 1999, 2000, 2001 and 2002: the club played eleven promotions in twelve seasons, but in none of them had options to achieve it. This demoralized the club, the fans and that ended up taking its toll. In those years all teams of Balearic Islands suffered from the same evil when they faced teams from the peninsula because the Tercera División Balearic group had a lower level in relation to other groups and Atlético Baleares was no exception.

The 2000s (I). Sinking and almost disappearing 

After playing 11 promotion phases frustrated in 12 seasons between the entity plummeted in every way. Extra-sports problems, always latent, eventually affected its performance. The institutional instability worsened: the relations between the club and the community of co-owners of Estadio Balear (Procampo), were getting worse. The change of managers and players were constant.

Seasons 2002–03 and 2003–04 were sportingly poor, but 2004–05 was the total collapse of the club. Players did not charge, and often did not have enough to complete the calls. Base football was dismantled. The internal confrontations caused that "Procampo" prohibited the use of Estadio Balear to the club and had to play in a municipal stadium. The reigning chaos inevitably harmed the team and descended to Regional Preferente. That was one of the darkest moments in the history of the club, since the entity was about to disappear after 85 years.

The 2000s (II). Recovery at all levels 

Since 2005 the club entered into a dynamic of economic and sports regeneration. It obtained the first support of the German real estate entrepreneur residing in Mallorca Matthias Kühn and later the entrepreneur Bartomeu Cursach. The team became champion of Regional Preferente the 2005–06 season and returned to Tercera División just one year after.

The 2006–07 season was planned as a year of consolidation in Tercera División, but the team was sixth ranked and very close to playing the promotion to Segunda División B

The 2007–08 season was planned to aim for promotion and the team was champion of Tercera División, and qualified for promotion to Segunda División B. First the AD Universidad de Oviedo, was beaten (1–1 in Oviedo and 2–1 in Estadio Balear), and after the qualifier played against SD Gernika Club (0–0 in Gernika and 2–0 in Estadio Balear). Thus, the club returned in Segunda División B after 18 years. But the 2008–09 season was a failure, the team ended up a group's latest and returned to Tercera División.

The 2009–10 season began with the same objectives two years before: to be champion and ascend. As two years earlier, the team won the Tercera División league championship and qualified to play the promotion to Segunda División B. It played with CD Tudelano, champion of the Navarrese group of Tercera División; the team won the first matx in Estadio Balear (1–0) and lost in the lap in Tudela (2–1), but thanks to the double value of the goals in the opposite field Atlético Baleares again achieved the ascent to Segunda División B.

Decade of 2010s (I). Consolidation in Segunda División B and conversion into SAD 

On return to Segunda División B in 2010–11 season the team achieved mathematical permanence in the absence of two matches. It was the sixth season in the category. But the season was much more momentous at an extra-sports level, with the beginning of its transformation into Public limited sports company (SAD).

On 5 May 2011 an extraordinary assembly of members approved the conversion of the club into (SAD) by a very large majority, with the aim of promoting the club to Segunda División short term. During the assembly also was announced the purchase of land for the construction of the future sports city of the club, which was achieved on 26 September 2012, one day before the celebration of the first general meeting of shareholders. Finally, the project did not move forward because it was not approved by the institutions. The conversion process in SAD culminated on 27 September 2012 with the first general meeting of shareholders and the election of its first board of directors.

The 2011–12 season was marked with the objective of qualifying among the top four to play promotion to Segunda División. After a brilliant regular league, the team was proclaimed champion of its group of Segunda División B two matches before for the conclusion of the championship. The team disputed the promotion of champions with CD Mirandés, for direct ascent; but not beat this tie (1–0 in Miranda de Ebro and 1–2 in Estadio Balear) and was forced to play the second round. Then play with CD Lugo, and it could not overcome either (3–1 in Lugo and 0–0 in Estadio Balear), amb was permanently eliminated.

For the 2012–13 season the club once again made a great economic investment to qualify for promotion to Segunda División, but the team traveled half a table throughout the championship and even it came to suffer for maintaining the category, because it assured the permanence only two matches afterdays conclusion. Whether or not it was due to bad sports results, at the end of the season, president Fernando Crespí and the club's top shareholder, Bartomeu Cursach, announced his retirement from the front line of the club.

The 2013–14 season was planned very differently. The institutional crisis suffered by the club, the progress of the main investors and the survival of the club in question, forced to make a modest team economically and to maintain the category. But from the beginning it was in the first places of the classification, and was even a leader in many days. A loose final straight left the team in fifth position and out of promotion positions.

Decade of 2010s (II). The Volckmann era, Copa RFEF and promotion aspirations 

Institutionally, after 2013 the main shareholders of the entity, President Fernando Crespí and the businessman Bartomeu Cursach decided to stop financially supporting the club that entered into an institutional and economic crisis that led to its judicial intervention. The situation worsened and in April 2014 the club entered into a bankruptcy proceedings with Demetrio Madrid Alonso as bankruptcy administrator appointed by the courts of Palma de Mallorca On 5 May the club faced a decisive shareholders meeting and a board of directors consisting of grassroots members was chosen, who saved the club from dissolution in extremis.

Since 2 June 2014 the club has come under the control of Ingo Volckmann, a German businessman based in Mallorca, after he acquired 51% of the shareholding package, and at the end of October of the same year the club left the bankruptcy proceedings. The following year, on 21 March 2015 a capital increase of three million euros was carried out that reaffirmed the ownership of the new property. Since then the economic stability of the club (currently SAD) has been absolute, unlike previous times.

In 2014–15 season, with the institutional crisis already resolved and the survival of the club guaranteed thanks to the new property, the club hoped to repeat the good role from the previous season. But the team moved for low positions throughout the championship and even suffered to achieve permanence until the final leg of the league, becoming finally twelfth.

The 2015–16 season in Segunda División B was planned again to be in the top positions and qualify for promotion. But during the league championship the team moved through intermediate positions, without suffering to maintain the category. Finally the team finished in ninth position.

But unlike the league championship, the team made a brilliant campaign in another competition: the 23rd edition of Copa RFEF, with the achievement of the title. After overcoming the regional phase the team went through rounds and rivals until the final with CF Rayo Majadahonda, that defeated to double game (2–2 in Majadahonda and 1–0 at home), and provide the club the first absolute national title in its history.

The 2016–17 season was initially like the previous one. A team with promotion aspirations was re-made keeping Christian Ziege as coach; but again he offered a lower performance than expected, through the middle of the table and this time removed to the Copa RFEF. The change of coach for Josico Moreno resulted a spectacular comeback that put the team in fourth place and to promotion to Segunda División on the last day. In first round the team managed to beat CD Toledo (1–1 at home and 1–2 at Toledo), but it fell in second round against Albacete Balompié (1–1 at home and 2–1 in Albacete).

During the same season several commemorative events of 75 years of the merger-absorption of Baleares FC and Athletic FC took place. The main act was a historical exhibition in CaixaForum Palma with a collection of photographs, objects and trophies, as well as references to the origin of the club in 1920. A gala dinner closed the events.

For 2017–18 season, despite the brilliant end of the previous season the coach Josico Moreno did not follow in the club and was replaced by the unknown Armando de la Morena. The team had a performance below expectations and the coach was stopped mid-season; the situation remained unimproved, with a team in relegation positions to Tercera División. The hiring of Manix Mandiola was providential and he managed and in extremis he could to save the team on the last day of the championship.

The great incentive of this season was that the local rival, the RCD Mallorca, had dropped down and there would be a derby in the league after 38 years, a milestone that had an international impact. In Son Malferit both teams tied (0–0), and in Son Moix the RCD Mallorca win by the minimum (3–2).

Despite the sporting instability, institutionally the club was quiet. The highest shareholder since 2014, Ingo Volckmann, made a new economic investment through a restructuring of the capital stock that confirms and expands its ownership of the SAD, and at the same time ensures the future of the club in the long term.

In 2018–19 season the coach of salvation, Manix Mandiola, remained. After a hesitant start, the team managed to improve results, place themselves in the high zone of the classification and occupy positions of promotion to Segunda División at mid-season and on day 25 he managed to gain the leadership of his group. It did not abandon this position until he won the championship in the absence of a day to finish the league. The team disputed the promotion to Segunda División with another group champion: Racing de Santander, with direct promotion at stake, but did not overcome the tie (0–0 in El Sardinero and 1–1 in Son Malferit and it was forced to play the second round. The team beat first the UD Melilla (0–0 at Melilla and 1–0 at home) and then it played the final round with CD Mirandés (2–0 in Miranda de Ebro and 3–1 at home.). Due to the double value of the goals in the opposite field, the team failed to ascend and remained again in Segunda División B.

The 2019–20 season initially ran like the previous one. The team managed to place itself from the beginning among the first classified and held the leadership of the classification for much of the championship. But after the dispute on day 28 and being the leading team, on 11 March 2020 RFEF suspended the competition due to the COVID-19 pandemic, first for two weeks and then indefinitely. As a result of this fact, the club applicated of a Layoff to the entire staff; subsequently, on 6 May Federation confirmed the completion of the regular league and the dispute of a simplified promotion phase that the team would play as champion of his group. The team played the promotion against another group champion: FC Cartagena, in a single match with direct promotion at stake; but did not pass the tie (0–0 and 4–3 on penalties). Thus, It was forced to play a second round, first against UE Cornellà; but fell defeated again (0–1) and definitively eliminated.

Rivalries 

The most important rivalry maintained by the club is against RCD Mallorca, a club of the same city. It is known as the Palma derby.

The CD Atlético Baleares (then called Baleares FC) was born in 1920 from workers and workers sectors of the city, and RCD Mallorca (then called Real Sociedad Alfonso XIII FC) was created in 1916 by politically and economically powerful social sectors. Today this character is very diluted and both clubs are much more heterogeneous than in the beginning, but the foundational character is still very present.

The rivalry has been maintained since the 1920s, despite they competing in different categories for many years (from the 1960s onwards and especially since the 1980s, when RCD Mallorca made a significant improvement) and through the successive names of the two clubs: Baleares FC (from 1920 to 1942) and CD Atlético Baleares (since 1942); and RS Alfonso XIII FC (from 1916 to 1931), CD Mallorca (1931–1949) and RCD Mallorca (since 1949).

Season to season

Mallorca Regional Championship

Spanish football league 

4 seasons in Segunda División
2 seasons in Primera División RFEF
16 seasons in Segunda División B
53 seasons in Tercera División
8 seasons in Categorías Regionales

Current squad
.

Reserve team

Staff

Technical staff 

Source: CD Atlético Baleares

Notable coaches 

  Gustavo Siviero
  Ignacio Martín-Esperanza
  Manix Mandiola

Presidents 

 Bartomeu Llabrés Albertí (1920–22)
 Jaume Llabrés Morey (1922–23)
 Gabriel Viñas Morant (1923–24)
 Cristòfol Lliteras Tous (1924–25)
 Antoni Miquel Puig (1925–26)
 Josep Jordà Alós (1926)
 Jaume Guasp (1926–28)
 Jaume Perotti Trulls (1928–29)
 Lluís Fiol Alorda (1929–30)
 Jaume Perotti Trulls (1930)
 Antoni Estarellas (1930)
 Jaume Perotti Trulls (1930–31)
 Rafel Estarellas Perelló (1931)
 Josep Ensenyat Alemany (1931–33)
 Damià Adrover PIcornell (1933–36?)
 Joan Serra Mulet (1938?–40)
 Damià Adrover Picornell (1940)
 Pere Serra Cladera (1940–43)
 Josep Ramon Serra (1943–44)
 Francesc Tomàs Cañellas (1944–47)
 Josep Móra Grisol (1947–49)
 Josep Roses Rovira (1949–49)
 Antoni Castelló Salas (1949–52)
 Joan Roca Rubicós (1952–53)
 Gabriel Ferrer Homar (1953–54)
 Gabriel Genovart Riera (1954–58)
 Rafel Vaquer Julià (1958–59)
 Salvador Llopis Lorenzón (1959–60)
 Joan Blascos Serra (1960–62)
 Sebastià Grimalt Riera (1962–64)
 Antoni Mestres Moll (1964–65)
 Fernando Gómez Gómez (1965–66)
 Jaume Planas Ferrer (1966–69)
 Joan Morro Albertí (1969–70)
 Gabriel Genovart Riera (1970–71)
 Jeroni Petro Alemany (1971–72)
 Management commission (1972–73)
 Antoni Mestres Moll (1973–74)
 Management commission (1974)
 Jeroni Petro Alemany (1974–80)
 Modest Subirana Cobos (1980–81)
 Management commission (1981)
 Joan Morro Albertí (1981–84)
 Andreu Amer (1984–85)
 Management commission (1985)
 Damià Estelrich Dalmau (1985–86)
 Bartomeu Planisi Pons (1986–88)
 Ramón Galante Roig (1988–89)
 Management commission (1989–93)
 Josep de la Torre (1993–96)
 Tomàs Cano Pascual (1996–98)
 Miguel Ángel Gómez (1998–2002)
 Josep Jurado (2002–03)
 Miguel Ángel Gómez (2003–05)
 Management commission (2005)
 Damià Estelrich Dalmau (2005–07)
 Fernando Crespí Luque (2007–13)
 Daniel Fiol Lustenberger (2013–14)
 Fernando Crespí Luque (2014)
 Joan Palmer Llabrés (2014)
 Antoni Garau Bonnín (2014–15)
 Ingo Volckmann (2015–)

Stadium 

The Estadio Balear is actually the home stadium of the club, located in Palma. It was inaugurated in 1960 and was closed in 2013 because of its poor maintenance. It was reopened in 2019, with 6,000 seats and the pitch's dimensions are 102×67 metres, but the works had not finished.

Previously, the home stadium was the Tirador velodrome (1920–21), Unión-Baleares (1921–23) and Son Canals (1923–60). During the closing of Estadio Balear the team played in Magaluf (in the neighboring municipality of Calviá) (2013–14) and Son Malferit, between 2014 until the reopening of the stadium.

Honours

National tournaments 

 Segunda División B
 Winners (3): 2011–12, 2018–19, 2019–20
 Tercera División
 Winners (11): 1950–51, 1955–56, 1960–61, 1964–65, 1967–68, 1997–98, 1999–2000, 2000–01, 2001–02, 2007–08, 2009–10
 Runners-up (10): 1956–57, 1957–58, 1959–60, 1963–64, 1965–66, 1985–86, 1986–87, 1993–94, 1994–95, 1996–97
 Regional Preferente
 Winners (3): 1974–75, 1982–83, 2005–06
 Primera Regional
 Runners-up (1): 1942–43
 Copa Federación de España
 Winners (1): 2015–16
 Copa Federación de España (autonomic phase) 
 Winners (2): 2009–10, 2015–16
 Runners-up (1): 2003–04

Regional tournaments 

 Baleares Regional Championship
 Runners-up (1):  1927–28
 Mallorca Regional Championship
 Winners (1): 1927–28
 Runners-up (9):  1924–25, 1925–26, 1929–30, 1931–32, 1933–34, 1934–35, 1935–36, 1936–37, 1938–39
 Copa Presidente de la República
 Winners (2): 1935, 1936
 Liga Mallorca
 Winners (2): 1939, 1943
 Runners-up (1): 1936

Another tournaments 

 Trofeu s’Agricultura
 Winners (4): 2007, 2008, 2011, 2014
 Runners-up (1): 2010
 Copa Uruguay
 Winners (4): 1959, 1966, 1967, 1968
 Runners-up (2): 1964, 1965
 Copa Ayuntamiento de Palma
 Runners-up (1): 1921

Friendly tournament 

Since 1966 the club have hosted the Trofeu Nicolau Brondo, the oldest summer tournament in the Balearic Islands. The hosts have won the competition on 29 occasions.

See also
 CD Atlético Baleares (women)

References

Sources

 DL PM 393-1959.

 Previous edition:

External links
 
Soccerway team profile 
Estadios de España 

 
Football clubs in the Balearic Islands
Association football clubs established in 1920
Sport in Palma de Mallorca
1920 establishments in Spain
Segunda División clubs
Primera Federación clubs
Football clubs in Spain